Corey Lamar Thurman (born November 5, 1978) is a former professional baseball pitcher, formerly of the York Revolution of the independent Atlantic League. He played two seasons at the Major League level for the Toronto Blue Jays.

Career
Thurman was selected by the Kansas City Royals in 4th round of 1996 Major League Baseball Draft. In , he played for the Milwaukee Brewers Double-A affiliate, the Huntsville Stars. He signed with the York Revolution of the independent Atlantic League for the 2008 season and re-signed with them for the  season. In December 2009, Thurman married Angela Day in York, PA. Said Thurman, "I met a girl who loves to watch Sports Center--what else can you do?"

Thurman was released by the York Revolution on May 25, 2015; after five appearances on the season, Thurman had an 8.23 ERA over 19.2 innings.  Thurman left the Revolution as the team's all-time leader in wins (66), games started (180), quality starts (60), innings pitched (980.1), and strikeouts (667).

Pitching Style
Thurman threw an 88-91 MPH four-seam fastball, an excellent changeup with good location at around 80 MPH, as well as a 75-77 MPH curveball and an 81-83 MPH slider.

References

External links
, or Retrosheet, or Pelota Binaria (Venezuelan Winter League)

1978 births
Living people
African-American baseball players
Águilas del Zulia players
American expatriate baseball players in Canada
Baseball players from Augusta, Georgia
Caribes de Oriente players
Florence Freedom players
Gulf Coast Royals players
Harrisburg Senators players
Huntsville Stars players
Lansing Lugnuts players
Major League Baseball pitchers
Mayos de Navojoa players
American expatriate baseball players in Mexico
Nashville Sounds players
Navegantes del Magallanes players
American expatriate baseball players in Venezuela
Omaha Golden Spikes players
Potomac Cannons players
Sportspeople from Augusta, Georgia
Syracuse SkyChiefs players
Tiburones de La Guaira players
Toronto Blue Jays players
Wichita Wranglers players
Wilmington Blue Rocks players
York Revolution players
21st-century African-American sportspeople
20th-century African-American sportspeople